Sir Charles Augustin Hanson, 1st Baronet (1846 – 17 January 1922) of Fowey was a British politician and 590th Lord Mayor of London.

He was born in Cornwall to master mariner Joseph Hanson and Mary Ann Hicks and was educated at Fowey School. He emigrated to Canada, where he made his fortune in the lumber business and returned to Cornwall c.1890. Whilst in Canada he married Martha Sabine Applebe, a wealthy Canadian heiress, with whom he had a son and a daughter. On his return he bought a tract of land in Cornwall and built Fowey Hall in 1899. However he spent much of his time in London as a stockbroker.

He was pricked High Sheriff of Cornwall for 1907–08. In 1908 he was awarded the Cross of Knight of the Order of Francis Joseph, which was conferred on him by the Emperor of Austria for services rendered.

He became an alderman of the City of London in 1909. He was made Sheriff of the City of London in 1911–12 and Lord Mayor of London in 1917–18. He was created a baronet on 6 July 1918. On 20 December 1920, he was appointed a deputy lieutenant of Cornwall. In 1920 he was made a Commander of the Order of the Redeemer by the King of Greece and awarded the Order of the Sacred Treasure by the Emperor of Japan.

He was also a Coalition Conservative Member of Parliament (MP) for Bodmin in Cornwall from 1916 to his death in 1922. His son, Sir Charles Hanson, 2nd Baronet was to become a Lieutenant of London.

Trivia
 Fowey Hall was the inspiration behind Toad Hall in Wind in the Willows by Kenneth Grahame.
 There have been 3 Lord Mayors of London called Hanson
 Sir William Purdie Treloar was another Cornish Lord mayor of London.
 Sir Charles owned the first Troy class boat

References

Sources

External links 

 

|-

1846 births
1922 deaths
People from Fowey
Baronets in the Baronetage of the United Kingdom
Members of the Parliament of the United Kingdom for Bodmin
Conservative Party (UK) MPs for English constituencies
Deputy Lieutenants of Cornwall
UK MPs 1910–1918
UK MPs 1918–1922
Sheriffs of the City of London
20th-century lord mayors of London
20th-century English politicians
Politicians from Cornwall
High Sheriffs of Cornwall
Members of London County Council
Municipal Reform Party politicians